Amess is a surname. Notable people with the surname include:

David Amess (1952–2021), British politician
Katie Amess (born 1985), English actress and model
Ronald Amess (1927–2011), Australian ice hockey player
Samuel Amess (1826–1898), Australian politician

See also

 
 Ames (surname)